{{Infobox military person
| name          = Karl Brunner
| birth_date    = 
| death_date    = 
| image         = 
| caption       = 
| birth_place   = Passau, German Empire
| death_place   = Munich, West Germany
| allegiance    = 
| branch        = Bavarian Army Schutzstaffel
| serviceyears  = 1917–19 (Bavaria)1934–1945 (SS)
| rank          = Brigadeführer
| servicenumber = NSDAP #1,903,386  SS #107,161
| unit          = Einsatzgruppe I
| commands      = [[Einsatzkommando|Einsatzkommando 4/I]]
}}
Karl Brunner (26 July 1900 – 7 December 1980) was a German lawyer, SS-Brigadeführer and Generalmajor of the police and the SS and police leader in Salzburg and Bolzano. Brunner served as head of the Einsatzkommando 4/I during the invasion of Poland and the early stages of the German occupation in 1939, tasked with the killing of Polish civilians. During his time in Northern Italy he was also responsible for the arrest, and ultimately, the deportation of the Jews in his area of jurisdiction, as well as reprisals against Italian civilians.

After the war Brunner was held at Island Farm Prisoner of War Camp. He later entered the Bavarian government service and died in 1980 without facing prosecution for his criminal conduct during the war.

Biography
Brunner was born in Passau on 26 July 1900 in what was then the Kingdom of Bavaria within the German Empire. During World War I, from September 1917 onward, he served in the Bavarian 16th Infantry Regiment "Großherzog Ferdinand von Toskana", from which he was discharged in 1919.

Leaving the Bavarian Army with the rank of lieutenant, Brunner joined the Freikorps, a right-wing paramilitary militia, in 1919 and was part of the Marine-Brigade Ehrhardt in 1922–23. After studying law at the University of Munich, he worked as a lawyer from 1927 onward.

In March 1933, Brunner joined the Sturmabteilung (SA), and the Nazi Party. In June 1934 he joined the Schutzstaffel (SS) and, from January to September 1935, worked in the SiPo. From April 1937 to June 1940 was head of the Gestapo in Munich. In this role he was responsible for securing employment in an aircraft factory for Max Troll, a communist-turned-informer who betrayed over 250 resistance members to the Gestapo between 1933 and 1936.

With the invasion of Poland, Brunner served as head of the Einsatzkommando 4/I until November 1939, tasked with the killing of Polish civilians as part of Operation Tannenberg. From early 1940 to April 1944 he was Inspector of the Security police in Salzburg. Simultaneously, since March 1941, he headed Amt Ia at the Reich Security Main Office. From 15 September 1943 he was also SS and police leader for the Alpine Foothills, based in Bolzano, a position he held until the end of the war.

During his time in Italy, Brunner, a fanatical Nazi, was responsible for the deportation of Italian Jews to extermination camps and reprisals against Italian civilians and partisans. Shortly after his arrival in Northern Italy, on 12 September 1943, he ordered the arrest of all Jews in his jurisdiction.

Brunner has been blamed for some the final atrocities committed by Germany in Italy, after the German surrender. After the surrender, celebrations of the Italian-speaking population broke out that saw 11 people killed in Merano on 30 April and 41 people killed at Bolzano on 3 May 1945, when Wehrmacht and SS units fired on civilians. This and the encounters between German troops and Italian partisans has been referred to as the Battle of Bolzano.

Brunner was arrested in Bolzano on 13 May 1945. He spend the next three years in British Prisoner of War Camps, the final year of it at Island Farm, and was released in May 1948. During his time in the SS he rose to the rank Generalmajor of the police, promoted on 21 October 1942, and SS-Brigadeführer (brigadier general), promoted on 9 November 1942. He was also awarded the Iron Cross first class in January 1945. His membership number in the SS was 107,161 and in the Nazi Party, 1,903,386.

In post-war Germany, Brunner worked for the Gehlen Organization, a predecessor of the Bundesnachrichtendienst, the domestic West German intelligence service. In 1956, he re-entered Bavarian government service, rising to the rank of a Regierungsrat'' in the district of Pfaffenhofen. Brunner never faced any charges for his criminal conduct in the SS during the war.

References

Citations

Bibliography
 
 
 

1900 births
1980 deaths
People from Passau
Gestapo personnel
Einsatzgruppen personnel
Sturmabteilung personnel
SS-Brigadeführer
Reich Security Main Office personnel
SS and Police Leaders
Holocaust perpetrators in Italy
Holocaust perpetrators in Poland
Military personnel of Bavaria
German Army personnel of World War I
20th-century Freikorps personnel